Jacopo Berrettini (born 27 November 1998) is an Italian tennis player. Berrettini has a career high ATP singles ranking of No. 388 achieved on 15 July 2019. He also has a career high ATP doubles ranking of No. 282 achieved on 13 September 2019.

Personal life
He is the younger brother of former world No. 6 Matteo Berrettini.

Career

2021: ATP debut in doubles
Berrettini made his ATP main draw debut at the 2021 Sardegna Open in the doubles draw, partnering with his older brother Matteo after they received a wildcard. The pair reached the semifinals where they were defeated by Simone Bolelli and Andres Molteni.

2023: ATP debut and first win in singles
Ranked No. 842 in February 2023, after receiving a wildcard for the qualifying draw of the Mexican Open, Berettini managed to qualify for the main draw by defeating Geoffrey Blancaneaux and Luciano Darderi. He recorded his first ATP win when his opponent, Oscar Otte, retired in the third set. As a result he moved more than 350 positions back up in the top 500.

Challenger and Future finals

Singles: 5 (2–3)

Doubles: 9 (5–4)

References

External links
 
 
 

1998 births
Living people
Italian male tennis players
Tennis players from Rome
20th-century Italian people
21st-century Italian people
Mediterranean Games bronze medalists for Italy
Mediterranean Games medalists in tennis
Competitors at the 2018 Mediterranean Games